Santa Ana de Velasco (or simply Santa Ana) is a small town in the Santa Cruz Department, Bolivia.

History 
The mission of Santa Ana was founded in 1755 by Julian Knogler.

Location 
Santa Ana is the central town of Cantón Santa Ana and is located in the San Ignacio de Velasco Municipality, José Miguel de Velasco Province. It is known as part of the Jesuit Missions of the Chiquitos, which is declared in 1990 a World Heritage Site, as a former Jesuit Reduction. The town is situated at an elevation of 464 m in the Chiqitanía region between Santa Cruz capital and the Brazilian border.

Transportation 
Santa Ana is located 441 km north-east of Santa Cruz, the department's capital.

From there, the national road Ruta 4 goes north to Montero, Santa Cruz where it meets Ruta 10. This road goes east for 339 km to San Ignacio de Velasco, on its way passing San Ramón, San Javier and Santa Rosa de la Roca.

From San Igancio, a dirt road goes south to San Rafael de Velasco and passes Santa Ana after 45 km.

Population 
The population of the place has increased rapidly over the past two decades:
1992: 284 inhabitants (census)
2001: 483 inhabitants (census)
2010: 684 inhabitants (updating)

Languages
Today, Camba Spanish is the most commonly used everyday language. In the past, various dialects of Otuke, such as Covareca and Curuminaca, were spoken at the mission of Santa Ana.

See also
 List of Jesuit sites
 List of the Jesuit Missions of Chiquitos

References

External links

 Santa Ana de Velasco: Description of Jesuit mission with pictures and information
 Map of José Miguel de Velasco Province

Populated places in Santa Cruz Department (Bolivia)
World Heritage Sites in Bolivia
Jesuit Missions of Chiquitos